Nomal (Shina) is a small valley located at a distance of 25 km north of Gilgit city in the Gilgit District, in northern Pakistan.  The valley is also connected with Nalter Bala and Nalter Pain through a metaled road.

Shina and Brushaski are spoken by the people and all inhabitants of the valley are adherents of Islam.

Geography
Since the times of Rajas (in Shina means Rahs) the valley is divided into mohallahs or sectors. The mohallahs are:
Sigal, Majini, Jigot, Batot, Kamalabad, Ishphis, Momin Abad, Sadaruddinabad, Das and Khaltarot.
The Nalter River flows through the northern end of the valley, which also supplies water to the entire valley, the river eventually merges with the Hunza River.

Sir Aurel Stein, a British archaeologist and explorer says about Nomal in his travelogue:"The first march of eighteen miles was to Nomal, a green oasis in the other barren valley of the  river which comes from Hunza."
A concrete bridge connects the valley to the Karakoram Highway, also to the villages, which are Jutal, Matum Das, Jagot colony, and Gujardas across the Hunza River.

Language
Majority of the people in the valley speak Shina language except in Sadaruddinabad, Das, Ishphis and Kamalabad where majority of the population speaks Brushaski.

See also
 Gilgit District
 Gilgit City
 Danyor
 Jutal

References

Valleys of Gilgit-Baltistan
Gilgit District